Trevigiani Phonix–Hemus 1896 is a Bulgarian UCI Continental team founded in 2014. It participates in UCI Continental Circuits races.

Team roster

Major wins

2014
Stage 1 Vuelta al Táchira, Rino Gasparrini
Stage 4 Okolo Slovenska, Christian Delle Stelle
Stage 1 Tour de Serbie, Liam Bertazzo
 National Time Trial championships, Andrei Nechita
Overall Kreiz Breizh Elites, Matteo Busato
2015
Gran Premio della Liberazione, Lucas Gaday
Overall Ronde de l'Isard, Simone Petilli
Stage 1, Simone Petilli
Gran Premio di Poggiana, Stefano Nardelli
2016
Stages 3, 4 & 6 Tour du Maroc, Matteo Malucelli
Stage 7 Tour du Maroc, Alex Turrin
Tour de Berne, Enrico Salvador
Overall Okolo Slovenska, Mauro Finetto
Stage 1, Matteo Malucelli
Stage 2, Mauro Finetto
Coppa Città di Offida, Enrico Salvador
Overall Tour of Bulgaria, Marco Tecchio
Stage 3, Marco Tecchio
2017
 National U23 Time Trial championships, Nicolás Tivani
 National U23 Road Race championships, Nicolás Tivani
Stage 3 Tour of Mersin, João Almeida
Stage 2 Toscana-Terra di Ciclismo, João Almeida
2018
Trofeo Edil C, Alessandro Fedeli
Gran Premio della Liberazione, Alessandro Fedeli
Stage 1 Toscana-Terra di Ciclismo, Abderrahim Zahiri
Overall Tour de Serbie, Nicolás Tivani
Stage 1, Nicolás Tivani
 National Road Race championships, Christofer Jurado
Stage 3 Giro della Valle d'Aosta, Alessandro Fedeli
Stage 7 Tour of China I, Manuel Peñalver

National champions
2014
 Romania Time Trial Andrei Nechita
2017
 Argentina U23 Road Race, Germán Tivani
 Argentina U23 Time Trial, Germán Tivani

References

UCI Continental Teams (Europe)
Cycling teams based in Italy
Cycling teams established in 2014
2014 establishments in Italy